Atra-Hasis is an 18th-century BCE Akkadian epic, recorded in various versions on clay tablets, named for its protagonist, Atrahasis ('exceedingly wise'). The Atra-Hasis tablets include both a creation myth and one of three surviving Babylonian flood myths. The name "Atra-Hasis" also appears, as king of Shuruppak in the times before a flood, on one of the Sumerian King Lists.

The oldest known copy of the epic tradition concerning Atrahasis can be dated by colophon (scribal identification) to the reign of Hammurabi’s great-grandson, Ammi-Saduqa (1646–1626 BC). However, various Old Babylonian fragments exist, and the epic continued to be copied into the first millennium BC. 

The story of Atrahasis also exists in a later Assyrian version, first rediscovered in the Library of Ashurbanipal, though its translations have been uncertain due to the artifact being in fragmentary condition and containing ambiguous words. Nonetheless, its fragments were first assembled and translated by George Smith as The Chaldean Account of Genesis, the hero of which had his name corrected to Atra-Hasis by Heinrich Zimmern in 1899.

In 1965, Wilfred G. Lambert and Alan R. Millard published many additional texts belonging to the epic, including an Old Babylonian copy (written c. 1650 BC) which is the most complete recension of the tale to have survived. These new texts greatly increased knowledge of the epic and were the basis for Lambert and Millard’s first English translation of the Atrahasis epic in something approaching entirety. A further fragment was recovered in Ugarit. 

In its most complete surviving version, the Atra-Hasis epic is written on three tablets in Akkadian, the language of ancient Babylon.

Synopsis

Tablet I 

Taking place, according to its incipit, “when gods were in the ways of men," Tablet I of Atra-Hasis contains the creation myth of Anu, Enlil, and Enki—the Sumerian gods of sky, wind, and water. Following the cleromancy ('casting of lots'), the sky is ruled by Anu, Earth by Enlil, and the freshwater sea by Enki.

Enlil, god of Earth, assigned junior  to do farm labor, as well as maintain the rivers and canals. After 40 years, however, the lesser  rebelled and refused to do strenuous labor. Enki, who is also the kind, wise counselor of the gods, suggested that rather than punishing these rebels, humans should be created to do such work, instead. The mother goddess Mami is subsequently assigned the task of creating humans by shaping clay figurines mixed with the flesh and blood of the slain god Geshtu-E ('ear' or 'wisdom'; 'a god who had intelligence'). All the gods, in turn, spit upon the clay. After 10 months, a specially made womb breaks open and humans are born.

Tablet I continues with legends about overpopulation and plagues, mentioning Atra-Hasis only at the end.

Tablet II 
Tablet II begins with more human overpopulation. To reduce this population, Enlil sends famine and drought at formulaic intervals of 1200 years. Accordingly, in this epic, Enlil is depicted as a cruel, capricious god, while Enki is depicted as kind and helpful. Enki can be seen to have parallels to Prometheus, in that he is seen as man's benefactor and defies the orders of the other gods when their intentions are malicious towards humans.

Tablet II remains mostly damaged, but it ends with Enlil's decision to destroy humankind with a flood, with Enki bound by oath to keep this plan secret.

Tablet III 
Tablet III of the Atra-Hasis epic contains the flood myth. It tells of how Enki, speaking through a reed wall, warns the hero Atra-Hasis ('extremely wise') of Enlil's plan to destroy humankind by flood, telling the hero to dismantle his house (perhaps to provide a construction site) and build a boat to escape. Moreover, this boat is to have a roof "like Abzu" (or Apsi; a subterranean, freshwater realm presided over by Enki); to have upper and lower decks; and to be sealed with bitumen. 

Atra-Hasis boards the boat with his family and animals, then seals the door. The storm and flood begin, and even the gods are afraid. After seven days, the flood ends and Atra-Hasis offers sacrifices to the gods. Enlil is furious with Enki for violating his oath, but Enki denies doing so: "I made sure life was preserved." In conclusion, Enki and Enlil agree on other means for controlling the human population.

The words "river" and "riverbank" are used in Tablet III, probably in reference to the Euphrates, the river upon which the ancient city Shuruppak, ruled by Atra-Hasis, was located.

Alterations and adaptations

Lineage of Atra-Hasis
In later versions of the flood story, contained in the Epic of Gilgamesh and the Sumerian creation myth, the hero is not named Atra-Hasis. 

In Gilgamesh, the name of the flood hero is Utnapishtim, who is said to be the son of Ubara-Tutu, king of Shuruppak: "Gilgamesh spoke to Utnapishtim, the Faraway... O man of Shuruppak, son of Ubara-Tutu." Many available tablets comprising the Sumerian King Lists support the lineage of the flood hero given in Gilgamesh by omitting a king named Shuruppak as a historical ruler of Shuruppak, implying a belief that the flood story took place after or during the rule of Ubara-Tutu.

In the Sumerian creation myth, first recorded in the 17th century BC (i.e. the Old Babylonian Empire), the hero is named Ziusudra, who also appears in the Instructions of Shuruppak as the son of the eponymous Shuruppak, who himself is called the son of Ubara-Tutu.

The Sumerian King Lists also make no mention of Atra-Hasis, Utnapishtim, or Ziusudra. Tablet WB 62, however, provides a different chronology: Atra-Hasis is listed as a ruler of Shuruppak and a gudug priest, preceded by his father Shuruppak, who is, in turn, preceded by his father Ubara-Tutu, as in The Instructions of Shuruppak. This tablet is unique in that it mentions both Shuruppak and Atra-Hasis.

Gilgamesh and the flood myth 
Subsequent versions of the flood myth in the Ancient Near East evidently alter (omit and/or editorially change) information about the flood and the flood hero found in the original Atra-Hasis story. In particular, a lost, intermediate version of the Atra-Hasis flood myth seems to have been paraphrased or copied in a late edition of the Epic of Gilgamesh (Tablet XI). This modern addition of Gilgamesh, known as the 'standard version', is traditionally associated with the Babylonian scribe Sîn-lēqi-unninni (circa 1300–1000 BC), though some minor changes may have been made since his time.

Regarding the editorial changes to the Atra-Hasis text in Gilgamesh, Jeffrey H. Tigay comments: "The dropping of individual lines between others which are preserved, but are not synonymous with them, appears to be a more deliberate editorial act. These lines share a common theme, the hunger and thirst of the gods during the flood."

Alterations 
Examples of alterations to the Atra-Hasis story in Gilgamesh include:

 Omitting information, for example:
 The hero being at a banquet when the storm and flood begins: "He invited his people...to a banquet.... He sent his family on board. They ate and they drank. But he [Atrahasis] was in and out. He could not sit, could not crouch, for his heart was broken and he was vomiting gall."
 "She was surfeited with grief and thirsted for beer."
 "From hunger they were suffering cramp."

 Editorial changes, for example:
 "Like dragonflies they have filled the river" was changed to "Like the spawn of fishes, they fill the sea." 
 Weakening of anthropomorphic descriptions of the gods, for example:
 "The Anunnaki (the senior gods) [were sitt]ing in thirst and hunger" changed to "The gods feared the deluge."

See also
 
Alan Millard
Babylonian and Assyrian religion
Flood myth
Gilgamesh flood myth
Noah's Ark
Sumerian creation myth

References

Notes

Citations

Further reading
Best, Robert M. 1999. Noah's Ark and the Ziusudra Epic. Eisenbrauns. .
Laessoe, Q. 1956. “The Atrahasis Epic: A Babylonian History of Mankind.” Bibliotheca Orientalis 13:90–102.

External links
  English text of The Epic of Atraḥasis

Akkadian literature
Flood myths
Mesopotamian myths
Shuruppak
Epic of Gilgamesh